The 1891 Cincinnati Kelly's Killers season was a season in American baseball. The "Kelly" in the name came from manager King Kelly, who was also the team's starting catcher. In 1891, their only season of existence, they finished with a record of 43–57, good for sixth place in the American Association, 32½ games behind the Boston Reds.

The team, which was also called the Cincinnati Reds, folded on August 17, and was replaced by the Milwaukee Brewers, brought in from the Western League. Kelly himself moved on to the Boston Reds. After the season, the American Association itself folded.

Regular season

Season standings

Record vs. opponents

Roster

Player stats

Batting

Starters by position 
Note: Pos = Position; G = Games played; AB = At bats; H = Hits; Avg. = Batting average; HR = Home runs; RBI = Runs batted in

Other batters 
Note: G = Games played; AB = At bats; H = Hits; Avg. = Batting average; HR = Home runs; RBI = Runs batted in

Pitching

Starting pitchers 
Note: G = Games pitched; IP = Innings pitched; W = Wins; L = Losses; ERA = Earned run average; SO = Strikeouts

Relief pitchers 
Note: G = Games pitched; W = Wins; L = Losses; SV = Saves; ERA = Earned run average; SO = Strikeouts

References 
1891 Cincinnati Kelly's Killers at Baseball Reference

Cincinnati Kelly's Killers season